U.2 (pronounced 'u-dot-2'), formerly known as SFF-8639, is a computer interface standard for connecting solid-state drives (SSDs) to a computer. It covers the physical connector, electrical characteristics, and communication protocols.  

It was developed for the enterprise market and designed to be used with new PCI Express drives along with SAS and SATA drives. It uses up to four PCI Express lanes and two SATA lanes.

History 
The Enterprise SSD form factor was developed by the SSD Form Factor Working Group (SFFWG). The specification was released on December 20, 2011, as a mechanism for providing PCI Express connections  to SSDs for the enterprise market. Goals included being usable in existing 2.5" and 3.5" mechanical enclosures, to be hot swappable and to allow legacy SAS and SATA drives to be mixed using the same connector family.

In June 2015, the SFFWG announced that the connector was being renamed to U.2.

Connector 
The U.2 connector is mechanically identical to the SATA Express device plug, but provides four PCI Express lanes through a different usage of available pins.

U.2 devices may be connected to an M.2 port using an adapter.

Availability 
In November 2015, Intel introduced the 750 series SSD which is available in both PCI Express and U.2 variants.

Since then, U.2 has achieved a high level of support from the major storage vendors and storage appliance suppliers.

U.2 compared with M.2 
 U.2 allows hot-swap, whereas M.2 does not.
 U.2 can use 3.3V or 12V for power, while M.2 only supports 3.3V.

As implemented 
While the U.2 standard does not imply a form factor of the device that uses it, in practice U.2 is used only on 2.5" SSDs. 2.5" drives are typically physically larger than M.2 drives and thus typically have larger capacities.

See also
 EDSFF – U.2 successor
 U.3 (SFF-TA-1001)

References

Computer buses
Computer connectors
Serial ATA 
Peripheral Component Interconnect 
SCSI 
Computer storage buses
SATA Express